Marve Bessmertnõi (born 11 April 1988) is an Estonian footballer who plays as a midfielder for Pärnu JK Vaprus and the Estonia women's national team.

Career
She made her debut for the Estonia national team on 12 August 2020 against Latvia, starting the match.

References

1988 births
Living people
Women's association football midfielders
Estonian women's footballers
Estonia women's international footballers
People from Põhja-Pärnumaa Parish